The 2021–22 National First Division (called the GladAfrica Championship for sponsorship reasons) was the season from 21 August 2021 to 15 May 2022 of South Africa's second tier of professional soccer, the National First Division.

Teams

Stadiums and locations

16 teams are competing in the season.

Table
<onlyinclude>

Results

Play-offs

See also
2021-22 South African Premier Division

References

https://www.timeslive.co.za/sport/soccer/2021-09-17-richards-bay-fc-handed-two-year-ban-from-home-stadium-by-psl-dc/

External links
PSL.co.za

National First Division seasons
South
2021–22 in South African soccer leagues